Silver Bullet is a 1985 American horror thriller film based on the 1983 Stephen King novella Cycle of the Werewolf. It stars Gary Busey, Everett McGill, and Corey Haim, with Megan Follows, Terry O'Quinn, Lawrence Tierney, Bill Smitrovich, Kent Broadhurst, David Hart, and James Gammon in supporting roles. The film is directed by Dan Attias, written by King and produced by Martha De Laurentiis.

Plot
The rocky relationship between Jane Coslaw, the film's narrator, and her paraplegic younger brother Marty changes after a series of murders in their small rural town of Tarker's Mills, Maine, starting in the spring of 1976.

Railroad worker Arnie Westrum is decapitated by an unseen attacker, pregnant Stella Randolph prepares to kill herself but is brutally murdered in her own bedroom, an abusive father Milt Sturmfuller is killed in his greenhouse, and Marty's best friend, Brady Kincaid, is also killed. After Brady's death, citizens form a vigilante justice group.  Although local Sheriff Joe Haller attempts to stop the citizens, he relents after Brady's father Herb berates him. Reverend Lester Lowe fails to dissuade the townsfolk from causing further bloodshed.

While the vigilantes hunt for the killer in the nearby woods, three are attacked and killed. The survivorsespecially Andy Fairtonlater deny seeing anything unusual. Afterwards, Reverend Lowe dreams that he is presiding over a mass funeral when his congregationincluding the bodies in the casketsbegins to transform into werewolves before his eyes and attack him. He awakens screaming and asks God to "let it end."

Because of the mounting unsolved murders, curfews are put in place, canceling the town’s Fourth of July celebration. The Coslaws decide to have their own backyard party and invite their mother Nan's alcoholic brother, Red. Red gives Marty a custom-built wheelchair/motorcycle, which he nicknames the "Silver Bullet," as well as a pile of fireworks so he can have his own celebration. Marty uses the Silver Bullet to go out in the middle of the night to a bridge where he lights the fireworks. The fireworks get the werewolf's attention, and it confronts him, but he escapes after launching a rocket into the creature's eye.

Marty enlists Jane's help to look for someone with a newly injured or missing eye. She discovers that Reverend Lowe is missing his left eye. Realizing that no adult would believe his story, Marty begins sending anonymous notes to Reverend Lowe telling him that he knows who he is, what he is, and that he should commit suicide in order to stop the killings. Lowe tries to run Marty off the road with his car. When Marty is trapped under a closed covered bridge, Lowe, whose condition has fractured his sanity, tries to rationalize the murders he has committed as doing God's work. Lowe apologizes and moves in for the kill until Marty calls for help from a passerby.

The siblings manage to convince Red that Lowe is connected to the murders and attempted to kill Marty. Red persuades Sheriff Haller to investigate. That night, Haller, still skeptical but desperate to find the killer, goes to Lowe's house and finds Lowe has locked himself in his garage to restrain himself from further killings. Before Haller can arrest him, Lowe transforms and bludgeons Haller to death with a baseball bat.

Knowing the werewolf is coming for them next, Marty and Jane convince Red to take Jane's silver cross and Marty's silver medallion to the gunsmith, who melts them down into a silver bullet.

On the night of the full moon, they wait for the werewolf, who cuts the power to the house and smashes its way inside, attacking Red. The bullet is nearly lost in the melee, but Marty is able to retrieve it and shoots the werewolf in the right eye. The corpse turns back into Lowe before dying. As the trio recover, Marty and Jane say they love each other and embrace, and Jane narrates that although she hadn't always been able to say it, she was able to say it from then on.

Cast

In addition, Joe Wright plays Brady Kincaid, Marty's best friend, while Tovah Feldshuh provides the narration as the voice of the adult Jane.

Production

The film was shot around Wilmington, North Carolina. Filming began in October 1984 and took about  months to complete, finishing shortly before Christmas. In the novella, the werewolf was said to snarl in nearly human words and the werewolf was supposed to speak in the original screenplay, although this was eliminated after a rewrite. Gary Busey felt a certain kinship with the Uncle Red character and was allowed to ad lib all of his lines in certain takes of each scene in which he appeared.  Although he read the lines as scripted in most of the takes, Stephen King and Daniel Attias liked the ad lib scenes better and decided to include most of Busey's ad lib scenes in the final cut of the film.

King asked for the werewolf to be plain, and hard to see, in contrast to the hulking monsters seen in other werewolf films and books in the early to mid-1980s, with the end result being a creature which looked more like a black bear than anything else and did not really have any identifying characteristics.  After seeing Carlo Rambaldi's design, per King's request, producer Dino de Laurentiis was very unhappy and demanded a change, which both King and Rambaldi refused.  Eventually pre-production fell behind schedule and director Don Coscarelli opted to start filming the non-werewolf scenes without knowing what would happen with the werewolf suit.  After completing the non-werewolf scenes and not having any clear picture about what would happen with the film Coscarelli resigned as director and was replaced with Attias. When pressured to either cancel the film or accept the design de Laurentiis relented and allowed filming to continue with Rambaldi's werewolf suit. A modern dance actor was hired to perform the stunts inside the suit but de Laurentiis was also unhappy with his performance and demanded a change. As a result, Everett McGill, who played Reverend Lester Lowe in human form, wound up acting out most of the scenes in the werewolf suit and was credited with a dual role.

Release
Silver Bullet was released theatrically in the United States by Paramount Pictures in October 1985. It grossed $12,361,866 at the box office.

Home media
The film was released on DVD by Paramount Home Entertainment in 2002, on Blu-ray in Germany on September 14, 2017, under the name Der Werwolf von Tarker-Mills.
Then on Blu-ray in Australia on January 3, 2018 by Umbrella Entertainment, and on Blu-ray from Scream Factory on December 17, 2019.

Reception
On Rotten Tomatoes, Silver Bullet holds an approval rating of 45% based on 22 reviews, with an average rating of 5.20/10. Roger Ebert gave the film three stars out of four. Ebert admitted that he thought that the film was a parody of the novella and of King's work in general, but said that he enjoyed the film. Conversely, Vincent Canby of The New York Times dismissed the film as "very low-grade Stephen King fiction" and thought the werewolf "looks less like a wolf than Smokey Bear with a terrible hangover."  Variety wrote, "'Silver Bullet' is a Stephen King filmette from his scriptette from his novelette which may sell some tickettes but not without regrettes ... the kids have a silver bullet, the only known power that will stop a werewolf. Unfortunately, there's no known power that will stop films like this." Rick Kogan of the Chicago Tribune gave the film one star out of four and called it "a limp retelling of the werewolf legend that is about as frightening as a rubbery Richard Nixon mask." Michael Wilmington of the Los Angeles Times wrote, "The human drama gives 'Silver Bullet' an extra warmth—and Marty's handicap and ingenuity make him a more attractive hero. But, with the exception of one startling dream sequence (a church congregation in mass vulpine metamorphosis), 'Silver Bullet' never really surprises you." Paul Attanasio of The Washington Post remarked that the plot "is about as suspenseful as looking at your watch to see which minute will pop up next," but Gary Busey's lively performance "almost makes the movie bearable."

In a retrospective review, Felix Vasquez Jr. of Film Threat and Cinema Crazed wrote, "'Silver Bullet' features one of the best climaxes in a horror film thanks to director Daniel Attias, and garners a very entertaining and creepy story that develops beyond a typical werewolf movie. When I think of great horror films, when I think of great werewolf films, and when I think of a great King film, I think of this."

References

External links

 
 
 

1985 films
1985 directorial debut films
1985 horror films
1980s English-language films
1980s monster movies
1980s mystery films
1980s horror thriller films
American horror thriller films
American werewolf films
Films about dysfunctional families
Films about paraplegics or quadriplegics
Films based on American horror novels
Films based on works by Stephen King
Films directed by Dan Attias
Films produced by Martha De Laurentiis
Films scored by Jay Chattaway
Films set in 1976
Films set in Maine
Films shot in North Carolina
Films with screenplays by Stephen King
Paramount Pictures films
1980s American films